Jon Andre Gower (born April 27, 1973) is an American television and film actor.

Life and career
Born in Los Angeles, California, Gower began his career at the age of five years as a child actor. His first substantial role was as Brookes Prentiss on the CBS soap opera The Young and the Restless from 1981 to 1982. He continued with guest starring roles on The A-Team, T. J. Hooker, and The Wizard. In 1986, he starred with Oscar-nominated Piper Laurie in an episode of The Twilight Zone, "The Burning Man". In 1987, Gower starred in the comedy/horror film The Monster Squad. Later that year, he starred for two seasons on the Fox series Mr. President with George C. Scott. From 1988 to 1989, Gower had a recurring role on The Hogan Family. Gower currently coaches actors and others entering the entertainment industry.

On November 5, 2014, Gower appeared on Ken Reid's TV Guidance Counselor Podcast.

Since 2016, Gower and one of his The Monster Squad castmates, Ryan Lambert, have been co-hosts of the Squadcast w/Ryan & Andre Podcast, for Fitterpiper Entertainment. The podcast covers The Monster Squad, as well as other films, and conventions that Gower and Lambert attend in support of The Monster Squad and its legacy.

In 2018, Gower produced and directed a documentary about the legacy, cult following, and fans of The Monster Squad, titled Wolfman's Got Nards.

On July 3, 2021, Gower nearly died after he suffered a massive heart attack while playing tennis with a friend. Gower needed a pacemaker installed in his heart. "my right coronary artery ended up being 100 percent blocked with a giant blood clot... Apparently, according to the people that worked on me and the excellent cath lab team, we got here with about 10 minutes to spare" Gower said in a Facebook video filmed from his hospital bed. A GoFundMe was set up to help pay for Gower's medical bills.

Filmography

Awards and nominations

Bibliography
 Holmstrom, John. The Moving Picture Boy: An International Encyclopaedia from 1895 to 1995. Norwich, Michael Russell, 1996, p. 392-393.

References

External links

The SquadCast

American male child actors
American male film actors
American male television actors
Male actors from Los Angeles
1973 births
Living people